Vehicle registration plates of Yemen started in 1993. The current version started in 2007.

Yemeni license plate types can be distinguished by their background colour, as well as an Arabic text above the numerical code, adjacent to the country name, (اليمن).

The numerical section of the license plate is divided into 2, with a horizontal line. On the left, a 1 or 2 digit code, indicating the Governorate to which the vehicle belongs. This number will be between 1 and 22. On the right, there's the numerical identifier code for the vehicle, which can range between 1 and 6 digits.

Plate Formats

Governorate codes

Southern Yemen

Due to the ongoing Civil war, political control in Yemen has fractured. This has had implications on vehicle registration plates. Most of the North, politically under the control of the Houthi-dominated Supreme Political Council, has retained the aforementioned registration plate formats. However, in the South, the city of Aden, politically dominated by the UAE-backed Southern Movement has developed a license plate design and format resembling those of UAE's Emirates (UAE License Plates). Most of the rest of Southern Yemen is politically controlled by the internationally-recognized Saudi-backed Govermnemt of Yemen. Individual provinces in the South have developed their own unique (but nevertheless similar is style and format) registration plates.

Aden City
Aden city, politically dominated by the UAE-backed Southern Movement, has started issuing license plates in formats resembling those of UAE's Emirates (UAE License Plates). The license plates feature a graphic of Ras Marshag Lighthouse, one of Aden's prominent landmarks, as well as a stylized Arabic Text saying "عدن" (Aden), as well as an English text saying Aden. The license plate currently consists of a 4-digit code, but is large enough to allow for 5, or 6-digit codes if need be. The license plate consists of black text and graphic and black boundary on white background. The numbers are in style of FE-Schrift.

Typical 1-line license plate, having a size complaint with that of European Union license plates, 520 x 110 mm

Typical 2-line license plate, installed on imported vehicles that can't accommodate a standard 1-line plate. Size compliant with American standard 335 x 170 mm

Hadhramaut Governorate
Hadhramaut Governorate License Plates consist of black text and black boundary on white background. Hadramaout Governorate plates consist of the governorate name in Arabic (حضرموت) and a 4 digit number. Hadramaut Governorate plates also have a strip on the left hand side with the letter H in black on a background whose color depends on the classification of the vehicle. Temporary plates have a strip on the right hand side that says "مؤقت", meaning temporary, on a blue background. The license plates for Hadramout use a unique serif font.

Al Mahrah Governorate
Al Mahrah Governorate License Plates consist of black text and black boundary on white background. Hadramaout Governorate plates consist of the governorate name in Arabic (المهرة) and a 4 digit number. Al-Mahrah Governorate plates also have a strip on the left hand side with the letter M in black on a background whose color depends on the classification of the vehicle. Similar to Hadramout, The license plates for Al-Mahra use a unique serif font.

The colour combination and structure of the license plates are similar to Hadramaout.

Marib Governorate

Marib Governorate License Plates consist of black numbers and black boundary on white background. Marib Governorate plates consist of the governorate name in Arabic (مأرب) and a 4 digit number. The governorate name is black on a background whose color depends on the classification of the vehicle. Marib Governorate plates also have a strip on the left hand side with the letter M in black on a background whose color matches the background color governorate name, and depends on the classification of the vehicle. The styles of Marib license plates thus differ from the previously mentioned southern governorates. The letter code used by the governorate, M, is the same as the letter code used by Al Mahrah Governorate. The license plates for Marib use a unique serif font.

Shabwah Governorate
Starting from February 2020, Shabwah Governorate joined Hadhramaut Governorate in issuing license plates in this new format and appearance. Similar to Hadhramaut, Shabwah  License Plates consist of black text and black boundary on white background. Shabwah Governorate plates consist of the governorate name in Arabic (شبوة) and a 4 digit number. Shabwah Governorate plates also have a strip on the left hand side with the letter W in black on a background whose color depends on the classification of the vehicle. Temporary plates have a strip on the right hand side that says "مؤقت", meaning temporary, on a blue background. The license plates for Shabwah use a unique serif font.

Taiz Governorate
Unlike the aforementioned governorates, Taiz Governorate has not replaced the previous and other existing registration plates with a uniform new format. Taiz Governorate traffic police has introduced two classes of "Temporary" License plates for vehicles missing a license plate. It is unclear how long such temporary plates will remain in circulation and what format will replace them, but they are de facto the current license plate format issued by the governorate. Taiz temporary license plates have a top row that states "ج - ي" (J.Y.), standing for "Republic" and "Yemen" in Arabic. There is also the text "مؤقت - تعز", meaning "Temporary" and "Taiz", the name of the governorate.

There are two classes of "temporary" license plates. The first class is for private vehicles as well as for Taxis and other for-hire vehicles. The plates for this class have black text and black borders on a blue background.

The second class is for commercial vehicles, such as trucks and vans. The plates for this class have black text and black borders on a red background.

References 

Yemen
Transport in Yemen